Juan Pacheco (born 11 December 1990) is a Mexican long-distance runner. He competed in the men's race at the 2020 World Athletics Half Marathon Championships held in Gdynia, Poland.

In 2019, he won the bronze medal in the men's marathon at the Pan American Games held in Lima, Peru.

He represented Mexico in the men's marathon at the 2020 Summer Olympics in Tokyo, Japan.

References

External links 
 

Living people
1990 births
Mexican male long-distance runners
Mexican male marathon runners
Athletes (track and field) at the 2019 Pan American Games
Medalists at the 2019 Pan American Games
Pan American Games bronze medalists for Mexico
Pan American Games medalists in athletics (track and field)
Athletes (track and field) at the 2020 Summer Olympics
Olympic athletes of Mexico
Olympic male marathon runners
21st-century Mexican people